Esad Kulović (1854 – 22 July 1917) was a Bosnian politician who served as the 4th Mayor of Sarajevo from 1905 to 1910. He was mayor during the Bosnian crisis of 1908.

Early life
Kulović was born to an old and prominent Bosniak family of Janissaries in the city of Sarajevo, Bosnia and Herzegovina, while it was part of the Ottoman Empire. His father was the only son of Sarajevo's qadi Sulejman Ruždija Kulović, after whom a street was named in Sarajevo in Ottoman times. Kulović was raised in the neighborhood which bore his father's name, and where he eventually built a large house.

Kulović was well-educated; in addition to his native Bosnian, he spoke Turkish, Arabic, Persian and French.

Politics
In 1884, he was elected the municipality representative of Sarajevo. Kulović became Mayor of Sarajevo in 1905. He was the mayor during the 1908 Bosnian crisis, when Austria-Hungary annexed Bosnia and Herzegovina from the Ottoman Empire. Kulović won a third term in office in the 1910 election by an "overwhelming" majority, but refused post, thus the position was handed over to 44-year-old Fehim Čurčić.

See also
List of mayors of Sarajevo
Bosnian crisis

References

1854 births
1917 deaths
Bosniaks of Bosnia and Herzegovina
Mayors of Sarajevo